Stekolny (masculine), Stekolnaya (feminine), or Stekolnoye (neuter) may refer to:
Stekolny, Magadan Oblast, an urban-type settlement in Magadan Oblast, Russia
Stekolny, Republic of Tatarstan, a settlement in the Republic of Tatarstan, Russia